This is a list of speakers and deputy speakers of the Jatiya Sangsad of Bangladesh.

List
Political parties

Sources
Official website of the Jatiya Sangsad

Lists of political office-holders in Bangladesh
Bangladesh, Jatiya Sangsad
Speakers of the Jatiya Sangsad